Luis Fernando Bohórquez (born in Bogotá, Colombia), is a Colombian actor.

Career 
Was born in Bogotá, Colombia, He studied at the school of dramatic arts and began working as an actor playing small parts in a few films as Colpo di Stadium. Later gained notoriety taking part with featured roles in several telenovelas such as Historias de hombres sólo para mujeres and La Saga, Negocio de Familia.

Meanwhile, he also obtained some roles in films, including that of the main character of Buscando a Miguel. In 2011 was the male lead in the horror film Wake Up and Die and later worked in some television series.

In addition to working as an actor, Bohórquez dedicates itself to activities of sculptor.

Filmography

Film

Television

References

External links 

1966 births
Male actors from Bogotá
20th-century Colombian male actors
21st-century Colombian male actors
Colombian male telenovela actors
Living people
Colombian male film actors
Colombian male television actors